The 2022 Judo Grand Prix Zagreb was held in Zagreb, Croatia, from 15 to 17 July 2022 as part of the IJF World Tour and during the 2024 Summer Olympics qualification period.

Event videos
The event aired on the IJF YouTube channel.

Medal summary

Men's events

Women's events

Source Results

Medal table

Prize money
The sums written are per medalist, bringing the total prizes awarded to 98,000€.

References

External links
 

2022 IJF World Tour
2022 Judo Grand Prix
Grand Prix 2022
Judo
Judo
Judo
Judo